Xhuvani is a surname. Notable people with the surname include:

Gjergj Xhuvani, Albanian film director
Aleksandër Xhuvani (1880-1961), Albanian educator
Dhimitër Xhuvani (1934-2009), Albanian writer
Visarion Xhuvani (1890-1965), Primate of the Autocephalic Albanian Orthodox Church

See also
Aleksandër Xhuvani University, Albanian university